Tam Soc Base was an Army of the Republic of Vietnam (ARVN) base located southwest of Sóc Trăng, Sóc Trăng Province in southern Vietnam.

History
The base was located approximately 14 km southwest of Sóc Trăng.

The base was attacked by a Vietcong unit on the early morning of 24 March 1969. Two U.S. military advisers from Advisory Team 71, Military Assistance Command, Vietnam, were killed in the attack, while a further two, First Lieutenant Richard Bowers and Staff Sergeant Gerasimo Arroyo-Baez were taken prisoner and subsequently died in captivity.

Current use
The base has reverted to housing and farmland.

References

Installations of the Army of the Republic of Vietnam
Military installations closed in the 1970s
Buildings and structures in Sóc Trăng province